Acetitomaculum ruminis is a Gram-positive bacterium species from the genus of Acetitomaculum which has been isolated from the rumen of a bovine in the United States. Acetitomaculum ruminis utilize formate, glucose and CO2.

References

Further reading

External links
Type strain of Acetitomaculum ruminis at BacDive -  the Bacterial Diversity Metadatabase

Lachnospiraceae
Bacteria described in 1995